Zhu Meichuo (2 May 1630 – 26 September 1647), known by her title Princess Changping, was a Chinese princess of the Ming dynasty. She was one of the children of the Chongzhen Emperor and Empress Zhou.

Biography
Changping was born to the Chongzhen Emperor and Empress Zhou.  Changping had 2 sisters: Princess Kunyi, Princess Zhaoren and 6 brothers: Prince Daoliang, Zhu Cican, Zhu Cizhao, Zhu Cilang, Zhu Cihuan, Zhu Cijiong.
She was known for her ingenuity.
At the age of 16, her father arranged for her marriage to Zhou Xian (周顯; a.k.a. Zhou Shixian 周世顯), a military officer. However, their wedding was cancelled as Li Zicheng and his rebel army was entering the palace. When the capital eventually fell to the rebels, because the plan of the emperor failed, even though the Chongzhen Emperor loved his family, he had to kill them, because he was afraid that after his death, his children's fate would be the same as happened with the fall of the Song dynasty: the princes were tortured until they died and the princesses were forced to become prostitutes.
At that moment, Changping found her mother's dead body at the temple. Crying and holding her mother's dress, her father came shouting at her "Why must you be born in this family?", and slashed his sword at her, cutting off her left arm. Changping fainted due to blood loss, after that having the luck to be saved by a eunuch. Nobody thought that she would survive, but she regained consciousness five days later, and found out that her father had committed suicide by hanging himself on a tree in front of the Forbidden City.
In 1645, Changping asked the Shunzhi Emperor of the Qing dynasty, which had replaced the Ming dynasty, for permission to become a Buddhist nun. The emperor refused and arranged for her to marry Zhou Xian. Changping got pregnant from this marriage, while 16~17 years old.

Princess Changping died during her pregnancy following an illness.

In popular culture
Changping had a greater impact on folklore and popular culture than history, with various stories revolving around the concept that she survived her early death.
 
A popular Cantonese opera The Flower Princess has her as a protagonist, and her beloved husband. Based on its first script and other publications, the first adaption debuted in 1957 at the Lee Theatre.

In 1981,  ATV Home adapted the play into a television drama titled Princess Cheung Ping (Chinese: 武侠帝女花), in a wuxia setting, starring Damian Lau, Michelle Yim and David Chiang. In 2003, TVB produced Perish in the Name of Love, a television series loosely based on the original play. Steven Ma and Charmaine Sheh starred in the leading roles.

A known tale about her tells that Changping became a nun after the fall of the Ming dynasty. She practiced martial arts and became a leader of the resistance movement against the Qing dynasty. She was nicknamed "One Armed Divine Nun" (獨臂神尼) for her formidable martial art skills. One of her disciples was Lü Siniang (呂四娘), the heroine who assassinated the Yongzheng Emperor in folklore.

Changping also appears as a major character in Louis Cha's novel Sword Stained With Royal Blood. She is called A'jiu in the novel and has a romantic relationship with the protagonist, Yuan Chengzhi. However at the end of the novel, after losing an arm and with her coming back to life, she decides to become a nun and she changes her name to Jiunan.
 
Also, she has a minor role in The Deer And The Cauldron, another of Louis Cha's novels that is regarded as an unofficial sequel to Sword Stained With Royal Blood. In The Deer And The Cauldron, Jiunan becomes a martial arts teacher to the protagonist, Wei Xiaobao.

See also
 History of Ming, volume 121 (明史列傳第九)
 Di Nü Hua, fictional Chinese story
 Sword Stained with Royal Blood, wuxia novel
 The Deer and the Cauldron, wuxia novel

References

Ming dynasty princesses
Legendary Chinese people
Buddhist folklore
Chinese amputees
1630 births
1647 deaths
Royalty and nobility with disabilities
Daughters of emperors
People from Beijing